Ardipithecus is the debut studio album by American singer Willow. It was released on December 11, 2015 through Roc Nation and Interscope Records. Willow is credited as sole songwriter on 11 tracks, and sole producer on 10 of them. The album also features contributions from Willow's brother Trey Smith, under the moniker AcE, and frequent collaborator Jabs. The track "F Q-C #8" was released as a single on May 7, 2015, with an accompanying music video. A video to the track "Why Don't You Cry" was also released.

The album takes its name from the genus of an extinct hominine of the same name.

Background
In an e-mail interview with Fader, Willow explained the name choice:

Critical reception

The album received mixed reviews from critics. At Metacritic, which assigns a normalized rating out of 100 to reviews from critics, the album received an average score of 51, which indicates "mixed or average reviews", based on 5 reviews. Among these reviews, not one was positive. Consequence of Sound critic Adam Kivel described the album as "impenetrable, even distancing." Kivel further wrote: "The album is a headscratcher, one that shows plenty of promise but also a personality abstruse to the point of mystification." Criticizing the album's musical simplicity and lyrics, The New York Times Ben Ratliff called the album as "essentially a Bandcamp record released by Roc Nation."

Now critic Kevin Ritchie regarded that Ardipithecus "undercooked production" as "a serious limitation." Ritchie further stated that the record "could've been distinctive but instead lacks depth or the transporting quality of her imaginative lyrics." Frank Farisi of Tiny Mix Tapes thought: "So much of listening to Ardipithecus feels immeasurable by good or bad." and concluded that the album "fails as a pop record, because it's barely aware that it's a part of that conversation."

Track listing

Notes
 "Drugz" is stylized "dRuGz".
 "Randomsong" is stylized in all caps.
 "Ur Town" is stylized "UR Town".

Personnel
 Willow – vocals, production
 Jabs – vocals, production
 AcE – production
 Mel "Chaos" Lewis – production
 James Chul Rim – production, recording, mixing

Charts

References

External links
 Willow Smith on Roc Nation

2015 debut albums
Roc Nation albums
Willow Smith albums
Experimental pop albums
Alternative R&B albums
Neo soul albums